Claire Louise Calvert (born 1988) is an English ballet dancer and is a first soloist at the Royal Ballet.

Early life and training
Calvert started ballet training at the age of three. She started attending The Royal Ballet School when she was 11, where she was coached by Darcey Bussell. She danced lead roles Raymonda Act III and Jabula on her graduation year. While she was a student, she danced roles such as a swan in Swan Lake, a nymph in The Sleeping Beauty and a snowflake in The Nutcracker at The Royal Ballet.

Career
Calvert graduated into The Royal Ballet in 2007. In 2009, while she was still an Artist, she made her principal role debut, as The Lilac Fairy in The Sleeping Beauty. She was subsequently named First Artist in 2010, Soloist in 2012 and First Soloist in 2016. She has since other principal roles such as the Queen of Dryads and Mercedes in Don Quixote, Lescaut’s Mistress in Manon, Queen of the Willis in Giselle, Hermione in The Winter's Tale, Gypsy Girl in The Two Pigeons, Sugar Plum Fairy and Rose Fairy in The Nutcracker and Mitzi Caspar in Mayerling She has created roles in works including Aeternum and Charlotte Edmonds’s dance film The Indifferent Beak (Deloitte Ignite 14).

Personal life
In March 2021 Calvert announced her engagement to her co-star and principal dancer of the Royal Ballet, Alexander Campbell.

Selected repertoire

References

Living people
English ballerinas
People educated at the Royal Ballet School
1988 births
Dancers of The Royal Ballet
People from Bath, Somerset
21st-century British ballet dancers